Brockhampton is a small village east of Cheltenham in Gloucestershire, England. It forms part of the parish of Sevenhampton.

In the 2001 census the parish had 349 people living in 157 households. The source of the River Coln, a tributary of the Thames, is close to the village.

References

External links

Villages in Gloucestershire
Borough of Tewkesbury